Vibeke "Babben" Lunde (21 March 1921 – 12 August 1962) was a Norwegian sailor and Olympic medalist. She was born and died in Oslo.

She received a silver medal in the 5.5 metre class with the boat Encore at the 1952 Summer Olympics in Helsinki, together with her husband Peder Lunde and Børre Falkum-Hansen.

References

External links
 

1921 births
1962 deaths
Norwegian female sailors (sport)
Olympic sailors of Norway
Sailors at the 1952 Summer Olympics – 5.5 Metre
Olympic silver medalists for Norway
Olympic medalists in sailing
Medalists at the 1952 Summer Olympics
Sportspeople from Oslo